Augusto Zweifel (12 July 1921 – 25 November 2021) was an Italian professional footballer who played for Novara, as well as Swiss club Chiasso. He also held a Swiss passport.

References

1921 births
2021 deaths
People from Novara
Italian people of Swiss descent
Italian footballers
Italian centenarians
Men centenarians
Association football midfielders
Novara F.C. players
FC Chiasso players
Serie A players
Italian expatriate footballers
Italian expatriate sportspeople in Switzerland
Expatriate footballers in Switzerland
Footballers from Piedmont
Sportspeople from the Province of Novara